(formerly GDH K.K.)  is a Japanese anime studio owned by ADK  that was established on February 22, 2000. Gonzo is a member of The Association of Japanese Animations. The company's predecessor Gonzo K.K. was established on February 11, 1992 by former Gainax staff members, but was later absorbed into its parent company, GDH K.K. on April 1, 2009 and it would assume the Gonzo trade name for itself.

History
September 1992: Gonzo Inc. established by former Gainax members.
May 1996: Digimation K.K. established.
May 1999: Gonzo Inc. changed its company name to Gonzo K.K.
February 2000: GDH established.
May 2000: Creators.com K.K. established.
April 2002: Gonzo K.K. and Digimation K.K. merge; the combined company is renamed Gonzo Digimation K.K.
November 2003: Future Vision Music K.K. established.
July 2004: Gonzo Digimation K.K. changed its company name to GONZO K.K.; Creators.com K.K. changed its name to G-creators K.K.; Gonzo Digimation Holding changed its company name to GDH K.K.
July 2005: Gonzino K.K. established.
September 2005: Warp Gate Online K.K. becomes subsidiary.
December 2005: GDH Capital K.K. established and Warp Gate Online K.K. changed its company name to Gonzo Rosso Online K.K.
February 2006: GK Entertainment established.
April 2009: GDH K.K. merged with its subsidiary, Gonzo K.K., and changed its name to Gonzo K.K.
June 2019: Gonzo transfers some of the properties to Studio Kai.
November 2019: Okinawa Gonzo was dissolved.
March 2020: It was revealed that the company planned to execute a reverse stock split. If approved, it would reduce the number of issued shares from 38,800 down to 24, making the company a wholly owned subsidiary of ADK in the process. After making Gonzo into an wholly owned subsidiary of ADK, it will transfer all of its shares in the company to Shinichiro Ishikawa.

Financial issues
The studio had a financial problem in their closing account in the 2008–2009 term and stated its deficit was estimated over US$30 million. The Tokyo Stock Exchange announced that on July 30, 2009 Gonzo would be delisted from the exchange.  This delisting is the conclusion of a notification made to investors in March 2008 that the studio's financial liabilities exceeded its total financial assets.  Since Gonzo was unable to reverse this, paperwork for delisting was filed at the end of June.

The studio is still able to operate, and its parent company GDH has absorbed it in an effort to consolidate management. The combined company now simply refers to itself as Gonzo. By April 2009, the merger was complete.

As part of the restructuring, GDH also sold the Gonzo Rosso game development subsidiary, GDH Capital financing subsidiary, and remaining shares of Tablier Communications initially acquired in March 2006. Gonzo Rosso K.K. was sold to Chushou service kikou kabushikigaisha (division of Incubator Bank of Japan, Limited) on 31 March 2009.

Since this deficit, Gonzo has started to post better earnings due to the release of titles such as Rosario + Vampire to western online streaming services such as Netflix. The marketing of these products to western audiences has returned Gonzo to financial stability, and Gonzo posted higher than expected profit margins in the April–September 2012 period.

Works

TV series

OVAs
1998–2000 – Blue Submarine No. 6
1999–2000 – Melty Lancer: The Animation
2002–2003 – Gate Keepers 21
2002–2005 – Yukikaze (anime)
2004 – Kaleido Star Aratanaru Tsubasa Extra Stage
2007 – Bakuretsu Tenshi -Infinity, Strike Witches, Red Garden: Dead Girls
2018–2021 – Hori-san to Miyamura-kun (#4–5)

ONAs
October 2001 – Zaion: I Wish You Were Here
July 2018 – Calamity of a Zombie Girl, with Stingray
December 2018 – Saint Seiya: Saintia Shō, production by Toei Animation
June 2019 – 7 Seeds
August 2019 - Hero of Robots

Films
January 2006 – Gin-iro no Kami no Agito Also known as Origin: Spirits of the Past
July 2006 – Brave Story
January 2009 – Afro Samurai: Resurrection (with Paramount Network Originals)
November 2013 – Bayonetta: Bloody Fate
February 2016 – Last Exile: Fam, The Silver Wing: Over the Wishes
November 2017 – Full Metal Panic 1: Boy Meets Girl
January 2018 – Full Metal Panic 2: One Night Stand
January 2018 – Full Metal Panic 3: Into the Blue

Games
1996: Lunar: Silver Star Story Complete (PlayStation / Sega Saturn) – contributed anime sequences
1997: Silhouette Mirage – contributed anime sequences
1997: Grandia - contributed animation support
1998: Lunar 2: Eternal Blue Complete (PlayStation / Sega Saturn) – contributed anime sequences
1998: Radiant Silvergun – contributed anime sequences
1999: The King of Fighters: Dream Match 1999 (Sega Dreamcast) - contributed anime intro sequence
1999: Genso Suikogaiden Volume 1: Swordsman of Harmonia contributed intro FMV and character stills
2001: Genso Suikogaiden Volume 2: Duel at Crystal Valley – contributed intro FMV and character stills
2001: SkyGunner – contributed anime sequences
2002: Suikoden III – contributed intro FMV
2003: Zone of the Enders: The 2nd Runner – contributed anime sequences
2008: Phantasy Star 0 – contributed anime sequences
2009: BlazBlue: Calamity Trigger – contributed anime sequences in home version
2009: Summon Night X: Tears Crown – contributed anime sequences
2010: Super Street Fighter IV – contributed anime ending sequences
2010: BlazBlue: Continuum Shift – contributed anime sequences in home version

Music videos
2004: "Breaking the Habit" by Linkin Park
2007: "Freedom" by Blood Stain Child
2008: "Forsaken" by Dream Theater

Shorts
2013: The Midnight Animals

Manga
2001: Vandread
2002: Vandread (Vandread Special Stage)
2003: Kiddy Grade (Kiddy Grade Versus)
2003: Kiddy Grade (Kiddy Grade Reverse)
2004: Bakuretsu Tenshi (Angel's Adolescence)
2005: Gankutsuou
2005: Speed Grapher
2007: Romeo x Juliet
2007: Red Garden
2007: Getsumen to Heiki Miina
2008: Blassreiter – Genetic

International distribution
Many of Gonzo's titles were licensed for North American distribution by Geneon, ADV Films, and Funimation Entertainment. ADV Films UK branch was the UK distributor for Gonzo titles licensed by ADV, with the exception of Gantz, as it was licensed by MVM Films. Gad Guard, Hellsing, and Last Exile, which were titles originally licensed by Geneon, were also licensed by ADV Films UK, although they're no longer licensed since the company's closure. MVM Films was the UK licensee for the majority of Gonzo titles licensed by Funimation in the US, with the exception of Afro Samurai, which was initially distributed directly in the UK by GDH and later by Manga Entertainment UK who also licensed Strike Witches (season 1), Origin: Spirits of the Past, and recently Last Exile and Hellsing. Welcome to the N.H.K., Pumpkin Scissors, and Red Garden, which were originally licensed by ADV Films UK, were re-licensed by MVM Films.

In June 2006, it signed a long-term output deal with the anime television network, Animax, which saw Animax broadcasting all of Gonzo's anime titles across all of its networks around the world, including Japan, Asia, the Indian subcontinent, and Latin America and from November 2007 on Southern Africa's DSTV satellite network. As of 2008 they decided to stream some of their airing anime on video sites such as: YouTube, Crunchyroll, and BOST.

References

External links
 

 
Japanese animation studios
Mass media companies established in 1992
Companies formerly listed on the Tokyo Stock Exchange
Japanese companies established in 1992
Suginami